Aznalcázar is a town located in the province of Seville, southern Spain.  It is only 20 minutes away from Seville, and is one of the 13 towns located in Doñana National Park, one of Spain's most important national parks and wildlife reserves.

As most Spanish towns, Aznalcázar has an active social and cultural life, with several bars and restaurants, annual “fiestas”, two supermarkets, one Spanish language school for foreigners and 3 banks. It is also home to Las Minas golf course.

Public transportation connects Aznalcázar with Seville, as well as nearby towns and landmarks such as El Rocío.

History

The town could be possibly identified with Olontigi, an ancient Tartessian settlement of which not much is known but its coinage issue between the 2nd and 1st centuries BC, bearing the Latin inscription OLVNT.  The Barrington Atlas of the Ancient World equates this site with modern Aznalcázar. Less likely alternatives proposed in the 19th century include Gibraleón, Moguer and Almonte, all in the Province of Huelva. Given Pliny's mention of the city along with Laelia and Lastigi on the Menoba river (Guadiamar), Aznalcázar, or a nearby town, is the most likely candidate.

The current name derives from the arab fortress and palace (ar: حصن القصر), which translates to "Fortress of the palace".

Main sights
Church of St. Paul, in Gothic-Mudéjar style
18th century houses
Old Fountain
Cerro del Alcázar, site of archaeological findings (such as Punic-Libyan coins) and of remains, such as remains of the fortress from which the town takes its name.

Tourism
Located inside the Doñana, one of Spain's most important national parks and wildlife reserves, Aznalcazar is a great gateway for ecotourism and Sevilla.  The town has one small hotel, one casa rural (bed & breakfast alike hotel) and one Spanish language school.

References

External links
Aznalcázar - Sistema de Información Multiterritorial de Andalucía

Municipalities of the Province of Seville